John Linacre (born 13 December 1955 in Middlesbrough) is an English retired professional footballer who is best known for his time spent with Hartlepool United, where he made over 200 league appearances in two spells with the club.

Career
After beginning as an apprentice at Coventry City – he never made a league appearance for the club – Linacre started playing for Whitby Town before signing professional forms with Hartlepool United in 1977. He stayed at the club until 1982, making 196 league appearances, before signing with Maltese club Ħamrun Spartans. Linacre spent one year in Malta, before re-signing with Hartlepool United. His spell back in Hartlepool only lasted one season, and he signed for non-league Billingham Town in 1984.

References

External links
Player profile at In The Mad Crowd

1955 births
Living people
English footballers
Coventry City F.C. players
Whitby Town F.C. players
Hartlepool United F.C. players
Ħamrun Spartans F.C. players
Billingham Town F.C. players
Association football midfielders